Belgium–Luxembourg relations are the bilateral relations between the Kingdom of Belgium and Grand Duchy of Luxembourg.

Both countries have a history of close cooperation, notably within the Belgium–Luxembourg Economic Union, Benelux and within the European Union.

Belgium has an embassy in Luxembourg and Luxembourg has an embassy in Brussels. , the Belgian ambassador to Luxembourg is Thomas Lambert. , the Luxembourger ambassador to Belgium is Arlette Conzemius.

Belgium and Luxembourg share a land border. The Belgian side of the border is mostly Luxembourg Province, with a small part of the German-speaking municipality of Burg-Reuland in Liège Province also bordering the Grand Duchy.

From 12 November 1964 to 7 October 2000, the Grand Duchess consort of Luxembourg was Josephine-Charlotte, born a Princess of Belgium and wife of Grand Duke Jean of Luxembourg.

See also
 Foreign relations of Belgium
 Foreign relations of Luxembourg

References

 
Luxembourg
Belgium